HMS Redbridge was the French schooner Aristotle, built in America. The Royal Navy took her into service as HMS Redbridge in 1807 and renamed her HMS Variable in 1808. She was sold in 1814.

Career
Lieutenant Robert Yates commissioned Redbridge in 1808 in Jamaica. 

On 26 July 1812 Variable captured Resolution, which was on her way to Havana with a cargo of flour, rice, etc. Then on 20 August Variable captured Trinidad, which too was on her way to Havana, but with a cargo of lumber. On 29 August Variable captured Louisa Antoina, bound to Havan with lumber.

In late 1812 , Captain John George Boss, and the schooner Variable captured the American privateer Dash. Dash was armed with one gun and had a crew of 30 men. Next, Variable and the boats of Rhodian, on 16 September 1812 captured , of one 12-pounder gun and 44 men.

In late March 1813 Variable recaptured two vessels and captured two more, all of which she sent into Nassau, Bahamas:
English schooner Mayflower (23 March), laden with flour, from Providence and bound to Providence;
English brig Dominica Packet (23 March), laden with sugar, coffee, etc., bound to Liverpool.
Spanish schooner Maria (23 March), laden with flour, bound to Havana from Philadelphia.
American brig Penobscot (27 March), laden with molasses and sugar, bound to Boston from St. Jago de Cuba.

Fate 
Variable was sold in 1814. She was struck from the lists on 23 November.

Notes

Citations

References
 
 

1806 ships
Ships built in the United States
Captured ships
Schooners of the Royal Navy